Public Announcement is an American R&B group, which was created by R.Kelly in 1991 after the R&B artist fired his former group MGM. They teamed with the singer for their collaboration album Born into the 90's (1992). The group is known for collection of R&B hit songs like "She's Got That Vibe", "Honey Love", "Slow Dance (Hey Mr. DJ)", "Dedicated", "Body Bumpin' (Yippie-Yi-Yo)", and "Mamacita".

Career

1991–1994: Born into the 90's
The group signed with Jive Records in 1991 after R. Kelly met the members from Public Announcement and auditioned them to be his backup singers and dancers. The group was originally R. Kelly backed up by Earl Robinson, Andre Boykins, and Ricky Webster. R. Kelly and Public Announcement released their collaboration album, Born into the 90's in January 1992. One of the last albums to be released during the new jack swing period of the early 1990s, the album included the hits "She's Got That Vibe", "Honey Love", "Dedicated", and "Slow Dance (Hey Mr. DJ)" all of which was led by Kelly, eventually leading to the album reaching a million copies domestically and going platinum.  (Overall, "Honey Love" and "Slow Dance (Hey Mr. DJ)" were the only two hits to reach No. 1 on the R&B chart during Public Announcement's tenure.) The group was billed as R. Kelly and Public Announcement essentially making the group backup members for Kelly rather than a cohesive unit. After a successful tour ended in 1993, Kelly parted ways with Public Announcement to begin a solo career, The group suddenly left the music industry after his departure. Public Announcement brought in a new member Big Mel. With Earl, Rick, Andre, and Mel, the group signed with Atlantic Records. They released a single "Take Advantage Of Me" but an album never materialized and Andre, Rick, and Big Mel left the group. Boykins and Big Mel worked on music together and individual careers. Boykins also continues to work closely with R. Kelly. According to his Myspace page, Boykins is currently a songwriter and producer at the Chocolate Factory studio in Chicago; he often tours with Kelly, and has been featured in many of Kelly's videos such as "I Wish", "When a Woman's Fed Up", and "Contagious" by The Isley Brothers to name a few.

Original member Earl Robinson recruited Chicago natives Feloney Davis, Glenn Wright, and Euclid Gray as new members of Public Announcement in 1996 and Davis took over as the lead singer. In 1997, they eventually scored a record deal with A&M Records and started working on their sophomore and solo debut album All Work, No Play. In 1998, they scored their first and only top five hit without Kelly, named "Body Bumpin' (Yippie-Yi-Yo)" released on February 3, 1998, which peaked at No. 5 Pop and No. 4 R&B. This album featured Feloney Davis taking over the lead vocals. Though having only one single hitting the Billboard charts, the album was a top twenty success on the R&B/Hip-Hop charts. After only a few years of being signed, they were dropped again.

1999–2002: Don't Hold Back
Shortly after touring, Euclid Gray left the group after the tour was over to pursue a gospel career and the group was dropped from A&M Records.

Gray was replaced with Chicago native Ace Watkins, signed with RCA Records and started work on their next album Don't Hold Back.

In 1999, a new song called "John Doe", from their album Don't Hold Back on Epic was released and was a minor R&B/Hip-Hop hit, which led to the album release being delayed. A few months later, in 2000, a new lead single called "Mamacita" was released. It was a moderate success entering number 39 on the Billboard Hot 100. After that, "John Doe" was re-released and went on to enter the Hot 100 at number 95.
Another single named "Man Ain't Supposed To Cry" was a top forty R&B/Hip-Hop hit.

After being let go by RCA Records, Feloney left the group to pursue a solo career with a single "I Don't Mind", shortly thereafter followed by Ace. In 2004, Feloney returned to the group, Ace was replaced by current member Mar-K Shaw, a native of Cincinnati, Ohio. Mar-K is the youngest member of the group and also the only member that is not from Chicago.

2005–present: When the Smoke Clears
In 2005, the group released their fourth album When the Smoke Clears on their own label, Boss Entertainment, through Fontana Music/Universal Records. After a hiatus, Feloney Davis, Glenn Wright, and Mar-K Shaw, with the return of Ace Watkins, the group began working on an expected follow-up album. Earl Robinson was not a part of the reunion.

2015: Continuation 
In 2015, Felony Davis, Glenn Wright, Ace Watkins, and Mar-K Shaw were set to release the tentatively-titled Continuation, their fifth career album. It was scheduled to be released independently through local Chicago imprint Twoguard Music Group – TMG Records. The single, "Fireworks", was released on iTunes August 10.

Members
 Feloney Davis – (1996–present)
 Glenn Wright – (1996–present)
 Ace Watkins – (1999–present)

Former members
 R. Kelly – (1991–1993)
 Andre Boykins – (1991–1994)
 Raymond Price - (1991-1992)
 Earl Robinson – (1991–2006)
 Ricky Webster – (1991–1994)
 Big Mel – (1993–1994)
 Euclid Gray – (1996–1999)
 Mark Shaw – (2003–2018)
 Luther Whitener - (1991-1994)

Discography

 1992: Born into the 90's (with R. Kelly)
 1998: All Work, No Play
 2001: Don't Hold Back
 2006: When the Smoke Clears

Official tours
Co-headlining
60653 Tour (w/ R. Kelly) (1993)
Seagrams Gin Tour W/Mystical 
90's R&B Tour

References

External links
Allmusic.com

American contemporary R&B musical groups
New jack swing music groups
R. Kelly
Musical groups established in 1990
Musical quartets
Musical groups from Chicago
Jive Records artists
A&M Records artists
Epic Records artists